Kasandrin Glas (trans. Cassandra's Voice) was a Serbian rock band formed in Beočin in 1993. Kasandrin Glas combined progressive and gothic rock and were a prominent act of the 1990s Serbian rock scene.

History 
The band was formed in Beočin in 1993 by Nadežda Obrić (vocals), Slobodan "Bob" Živković (guitar, synthesizer, bass guitar), Igor Olejar (bass guitar) and Frane Malenica (drums). They recorded their eponymous debut album Kasandrin glas and released it through Metropolis Records in 1995. The album, recorded at the Novi Sad Do-Re-Mi studio from September until December 1994, featured guest appearances by Aleksandar Banjac, playing keyboards on the track "Let 2" ("Flight No. 2"), Deže Molnar, playing clarinet on the same track, and Aleksandar Stamenković, playing keyboards on the tracks "Strah" ("Fear") and "Voda" ("Water"). The entire material was written by the band themselves and the album was produced by Živković and Melanica.

The follow-up, the album Neko kao ja (Someone Like Me), featuring a more guitar-oriented sound, was released in 1997 by Music YUser record label. The music for the album was written by Bedov, Živković and Malenica, and the album lyrics were written by Nataša Malenica. Produced by the former Pekinška Patka bassist Marinko "Mare" Vukomanović, the album featured a former Obojeni Program bassist Miroslav "Micke" Bedov as the new band member. The album, recorded at Veternik studio Matrix during 1996, featured the guest appearances by the politician Nenad Čanak, playing minimoog on the track "Labud" ("The Swan"), and Miroslav Marelj, playing guitar on the track "Ptica" ("The Bird"). After the album release, the band ceased to exist.

Discography

Studio albums
 Kasandrin glas (1995)
 Neko kao ja (1997)

References

External links 
 Kasandrin Glas at Discogs
 Kasandrin Glas at Last.fm

Serbian progressive rock groups
Serbian gothic rock groups
Serbian psychedelic rock music groups
Neo-psychedelia groups
Musical groups established in 1993
Musical groups disestablished in 1997
1993 establishments in Yugoslavia